River Styx is an unincorporated community in Medina County, Ohio, United States. River Styx is located 4.5  miles from Wadsworth and 6.5 miles from Medina.

A post office called River Styx was established in 1828, and remained in operation until it was discontinued in 1905. The community and the nearby Styx River derive their names from the Styx, a river in Greek mythology. The gloomy character of a nearby swamp caused the name to be selected.  River Styx has been noted for its unusual place name.

There is a cemetery that was established as a pioneer homestead graveyard in 1821.

Notable person
Marvin B. Rosenberry, Chief Justice of the Wisconsin Supreme Court

Notes

External links
The River Styx, Ohio, and other poems, by Mary Oliver.

Unincorporated communities in Ohio
Unincorporated communities in Medina County, Ohio